Shobeyshi may refer to:
 Shobeyshi-ye Bozorg
 Shobeyshi-ye Kuchak